Deym Ebn-e Najm (also Romanized as Deym Ebn-e Najm and Dīm Ebn-e Najm; also known as Deym Ben Najm and Kāz̧emī-ye Seh) is a village in Gharb-e Karun Rural District, in the Central District of Khorramshahr County, Khuzestan Province, Iran. At the 2006 census, its population was 738, in 136 families.

References 

Populated places in Khorramshahr County